Gynostemma pentaphyllum, also called jiaogulan (Pinyin: jiǎogǔlán, literally "twisting blue plant"), is a dioecious, herbaceous climbing vine of the family Cucurbitaceae (cucumber or gourd family) widely distributed in South and East Asia as well as New Guinea. Jiaogulan has recently been incorporated into traditional medicine.

Description
Among many common names are five-leaf ginseng, poor man's ginseng, miracle grass, fairy herb, sweet tea vine, gospel herb, and southern ginseng.

Jiaogulan belongs to the genus Gynostemma, in the family Cucurbitaceae, which includes cucumbers, gourds, and melons. Its fruit is a small purple inedible gourd. It is a climbing vine, attaching itself to supports using tendrils. The serrated leaflets commonly grow in groups of five (as in G. pentaphyllum) although some species can have groups of three or seven leaflets. The plant is dioecious, meaning each plant exists either as male or female. Therefore, if seeds are desired, both a male and female plant must be grown.

Taxonomy

Gynostemma pentaphyllum is known as Jiaogulan ( in China. The plant was first described in 1406 CE by Zhu Xiao, who presented a description and sketch in the book Materia Medica for Famine as a survival food rather than a medicinal herb. The earliest record of jiaogulan's use as a drug comes from herbalist Li Shizhen's book Compendium of Materia Medica published in 1578, identifying jiaogulan for treating various ailments such as hematuria, edema in the pharynx and neck, tumors, and trauma. While Li Shizhen had confused jiaogulan with an analogous herb Wulianmei, in 1848 Wu Qi-Jun rectified this confusion in Textual Investigation of Herbal Plants.

Modern recognition of the plant outside of China originated from research in sugar substitutes. In the 1970s, while analyzing the sweet component of the jiaogulan plant (known as amachazuru in Japan), Masahiro Nagai discovered saponins identical to those in Panax ginseng. Continued research has described several more saponins (gypenosides) comparable or identical to those found in ginseng. Panax ginseng contains ginsenosides while gypenoside saponins have been found in jiaogulan.

Distribution and habitat
G. pentaphyllum is one of about 17 species in the genus Gynostemma, including nine species endemic to China. However, G. pentaphyllum has a wide distribution outside of China, ranging from India and Bangladesh to Southeast Asia to Japan and Korea as well as to New Guinea.

Jiaogulan is a vine hardy to USDA zone 8 in which it may grow as a short lived perennial plant. It can be grown as an annual in most temperate climates, in well-drained soil with full sun. It does not grow well in cold climates with temperatures below freezing.

Chemistry and toxicity
Constituents of G. pentaphyllum include sterols, saponin, flavonoids, and chlorophyll. Gypenosides have been extracted from its leaves. Some saponin compounds are the same as those found in ginseng roots. While there have been in vitro studies on toxicity, there have been no clinical trials, therefore no information is available about human toxicity.

Uses
The plant is used in folk medicine, typically as an herbal tea, but may be used as an alcohol extract or in dietary supplements. It has not seen widespread use in traditional Chinese medicine (TCM), being adopted only in the past 20 years, because it grows far from central China where TCM evolved; consequently, it was not included in the standard pharmacopoeia of the TCM system. Before then, it was a locally-known herb used primarily in mountainous regions of southern China and in northern Vietnam. It is described by the local inhabitants as the "immortality herb" (仙草, xiān cǎo), because a large number of elderly people within Guizhou Province reported consuming the plant regularly. In the European Union, jiaogulan is considered a novel food following a 2012 court ruling that prohibited its sale as food.

Research
Some limited research has assessed the potential for jiaogulan to affect such disorders as cardiovascular diseases, hyperlipidemia, or type 2 diabetes, but these studies were too preliminary to allow any conclusion that it was beneficial. A small trial suggested mild anxiety reducing effects, though these were not statistically significant.

References

Cucurbitaceae
Herbs
Chinese folklore
Dietary supplements
Sugar substitutes
Plants used in traditional Chinese medicine
Herbal tea
Chinese teas
Flora of tropical Asia
Flora of China
Flora of Japan
Flora of Korea
Flora of Taiwan
Taxa named by Carl Peter Thunberg
Dioecious plants